John Anthony Danaher (January 9, 1899 – September 22, 1990) was a United States senator from Connecticut, and a United States circuit judge of the United States Court of Appeals for the District of Columbia Circuit.

Danaher defeated incumbent Senator Augustine Lonergan in the 1938 United States Senate election in Connecticut.

Education and career

Born on January 9, 1899, in Meriden, New Haven County, Connecticut, Danaher attended the local schools. He received an Artium Baccalaureus degree in 1920 from Yale University and then attended Yale Law School, serving as a lieutenant in the United States Army in 1918 as a member of the Student's Army Training Corps and in the Officers' Reserve Corps. He was admitted to the bar in 1922. He entered private practice in Hartford, Connecticut and later Washington, D.C. from 1922 to 1953. He served as an Assistant United States Attorney for the District of Connecticut from 1922 to 1934. He was Secretary of State for the State of Connecticut and a member of the State Board of Finance and Control from 1933 to 1935. He was a Republican United States Senator from Connecticut from January 3, 1939 to January 3, 1945, and was an unsuccessful candidate for reelection in 1944. He was counsel to the National Republican Senatorial Committee from 1946 to 1953.

Federal judicial service

Danaher received a recess appointment from President Dwight D. Eisenhower on October 1, 1953, to a seat on the United States Court of Appeals for the District of Columbia Circuit vacated by Judge James McPherson Proctor, taking the oath of office on November 20, 1953. He was nominated to the same position by President Eisenhower on January 11, 1954. He was confirmed by the United States Senate on March 30, 1954, and received his commission on March 31, 1954. He assumed senior status on January 22, 1969. After taking senior status, he served part time with the United States Court of Appeals for the Second Circuit. He took inactive senior status in 1980. His service terminated on September 22, 1990, due to his death in West Hartford, Connecticut, where he had resided since 1969. He was interred at the Sacred Heart Cemetery in Meriden.

Family

Danher's grandson, John A. Danaher III, is a Superior Court Judge who currently sits in Litchfield, Connecticut.

References

Sources

External links 
 John Anthony Danaher papers (MS 165). Manuscripts and Archives, Yale University Library. 

Judges of the United States Court of Appeals for the D.C. Circuit
United States court of appeals judges appointed by Dwight D. Eisenhower
20th-century American judges
Politicians from Hartford, Connecticut
People from Washington, D.C.
1899 births
1990 deaths
Secretaries of the State of Connecticut
Yale Law School alumni
United States Attorneys for the District of Connecticut
Republican Party United States senators from Connecticut
Connecticut Republicans
Assistant United States Attorneys